Jacut was a 5th-century Cornish Saint who worked in Brittany. He is commemorated liturgically on 6 February.

His father was Fragan, a prince of Dumnonia, and his mother Gwen Teirbron. The young family had fled to Brittany to avoid the plague raging in Cornwall at that time, and so grew up in Ploufragan near Saint-Brieuc with his brothers, Winwaloe and Wethenoc and a sister, Creirwy. He was educated by Budoc of Dol on the Île Lavret near Paimpol, and as an adult he founded churches in Brittany.

Today he is memorialised in the towns of Saint-Jacut-les-Pins, Saint-Jacut-du-Mené, Saint-Jacut-de-la-Mer and the Abbey of Saint-Jacut in that town.

Gallery

References

5th-century Christian saints
5th-century births
Year of birth unknown
Year of death missing